Clear Mirror on Royal Genealogy ("The clear mirror" for short) was a pseudo-historical work written by Lama Dampa Sonam Gyaltsen, who was a ruler of Sakya during 14th century.

References

14th-century books
History of Tibet
Tibetan literature
Tibetan Buddhist treatises